Lochee West railway station served the area of Lochee, Dundee, Scotland from 1861 to 1916 on the Dundee and Newtyle Railway.

History 
The station opened as Victoria on 10 June 1861 by the Dundee and Newtyle Railway. There was a goods yard to the north which had a shed. The station's name was changed to Camperdown on 1 May 1862 and changed to Lochee West on 1 February 1896. The station closed to both passengers and goods traffic on 1 January 1916.

References

External links 

Disused railway stations in Dundee
Railway stations in Great Britain opened in 1861
Railway stations in Great Britain closed in 1916
1861 establishments in Scotland
1916 disestablishments in Scotland
Former Caledonian Railway stations